Gyan Chandra Mishra is an Indian immunologist, cell biologist and the Director of the National Centre for Cell Science, Pune, known for his researches towards the therapeutic control of diseases such as HIV, tuberculosis and malaria. He was honoured by the Government of India in 2003 with Padma Shri, the fourth highest Indian civilian award.

Biography
Gyan Chandra Mishra, born on the Indian Independence Day of 15 August 1947, graduated (BSc) in biology from Gorakhpur University from where he secured his master's degree (MSc), too. His doctoral studies (PhD) were at the University of Udaipur on completion of which he joined the Central Drug Research Institute (CDRI), Lucknow as a Pool Officer. Later, he underwent advanced training in immunology at the Southwestern Medical Centre of the University of Texas in Dallas and, on return to India in 1987, he joined the Institute of Microbial Technology (IMTECH), Chandigarh as a scientist. In 1995, he moved to the National Center for Cell Science, Pune and serves the institute as its Director.

Mishra is credited with research in the field of immunology related to the diseases of HIV, leishmaniasis, malaria and tuberculosis and his researches have been recorded by way of scientific papers published in several peer reviewed journals. He is an elected fellow of Indian National Science Academy, National Academy of Sciences, India and the Indian Academy of Sciences. He has also guided several doctoral students. Mishra, a recipient of the Ranbaxy Research Foundation Award in 2002, was awarded the Padma Shri by the Government of India in 2003.

See also
 Immunology
 Cell biology

References

External links
 

Recipients of the Padma Shri in science & engineering
Living people
1947 births
Indian medical researchers
Indian medical writers
Indian immunologists
Fellows of the Indian Academy of Sciences
Fellows of the Indian National Science Academy
Fellows of The National Academy of Sciences, India
Council of Scientific and Industrial Research
Deen Dayal Upadhyay Gorakhpur University alumni
Mohanlal Sukhadia University alumni
University of Texas at Austin faculty
20th-century Indian biologists